Karl (Kaarlo) Fredrik Salovaara (20 July 1874 in Hämeenlinna – 4 January 1956; surname until 1896 Lundahl) was a Finnish Lutheran clergyman and politician. He was a member of the Parliament of Finland from 1936 to 1939, representing the Patriotic People's Movement (IKL).

References

1874 births
1956 deaths
People from Hämeenlinna
People from Häme Province (Grand Duchy of Finland)
20th-century Finnish Lutheran clergy
Patriotic People's Movement (Finland) politicians
Members of the Parliament of Finland (1936–39)
University of Helsinki alumni
Finnish fascists